Pantoporia assamica, the Assam lascar, is a species of nymphalid butterfly found in tropical and subtropical Asia.

References

Cited references

Pantoporia
Fauna of Pakistan
Butterflies of Asia
Butterflies described in 1881